Rubus miser is a Mesoamerican species of brambles in the rose family. It grows in southern Mexico (Oaxaca, Chiapas) and Central America (Guatemala, El Salvador, Honduras, Nicaragua, Costa Rica, Panamá).

Rubus miser is an arching shrub with curved prickles. Leaves are compound with 3 thick, leathery leaflets. Fruits are black and very sour.

References

miser
Flora of Central America
Flora of Mexico
Plants described in 1853